Radio code is any code that is commonly used over a telecommunication system such as Morse code, brevity codes and procedure words.

Brevity code  

Brevity codes are designed to convey complex information with a few words or codes. Specific brevity codes include:
 ACP-131
 Aeronautical Code signals
 ARRL Numbered Radiogram
 Multiservice tactical brevity code
 Ten-code
 Phillips Code
 NOTAM Code

Operating signals
Brevity codes that are specifically designed for use 
between communications operators and to support communication operations are referred to as "operating signals". These include:
 Prosigns for Morse code
 92 Code, Western Union telegraph brevity codes
 Q code, initially developed for commercial radiotelegraph communication, later adopted by other radio services, especially amateur radio. Used since circa 1909.
 QN Signals, published by the ARRL and used by Amateur radio operators to assist in the transmission of ARRL Radiograms in the National Traffic System.
 R code, published by the British Post Office in 1908 for use only by British coastal wireless stations and ships licensed by the Postmaster General.
 S code, published by the British Post Office in 1908 for use only by British coastal wireless stations and ships licensed by the Postmaster General.
 X code, used by European military services as a wireless telegraphy code in the 1930s and 1940s
 Z code, also used in the early days of radiotelegraph communication.

Other 
Morse code, is commonly used in Amateur radio. Morse code abbreviations are a type of brevity code. Procedure words used in radiotelephony procedure, are a type of radio code. Spelling alphabets, including the ICAO spelling alphabet, are commonly used in communication over radios and telephones.

Other meanings 

Many car audio systems (car radios) have a so-called 'radio code' number which needs to be entered after a power disconnection. This was introduced as a measure to deter theft of these devices. If the code is entered correctly, the radio is activated for use. Entering the code incorrectly several times in a row will cause a temporary or permanent lockout. Some car radios have another check which operates in conjunction with car electronics. If the VIN or another vehicle ID matches the previously stored one, the radio is activated. If the radio cannot verify the vehicle, it is considered to be moved into another vehicle. The radio will then request for the code number or simply refuse to operate and display an error message such as "CANCHECK" or "SECURE".

See also 
 Encoding

References

Broad-concept articles
Telecommunications